Sara Anneli Algotsson Ostholt (born 8 December 1974 in Rockneby, Sweden) is a Swedish equestrian. At the 2012 Summer Olympics she competed in both the team and the individual eventing. Algotsson won a silver medal in the individual eventing.

She is the younger sister of fellow rider Linda Algotsson. She is married to German equestrian Frank Ostholt.

She lost one of her lead horses in a vehicle fire while on the way to a competition. The probable cause of the fire was stated as a mechanical issue.

Notable Horses 

 Robin Des Bois - 1989 Bay Swedish Warmblood Gelding (Robin Z x Prince Pair)
 1999 European Championships - Team Fifth Place
 2003 FEI World Cup Final - Seventh Place
 2004 FEI World Cup Final - 13th Place
 2004 Athens Olympics - Team Ninth Place, Individual 34th Place
 Sollozzo - 2002 Chestnut Swedish Warmblood Gelding (Cortus x Ceylon)
 2008 FEI Eventing Young Horse World Championships - Fourth Place
 Wega - 2001 Gray Swedish Warmblood Mare (Irco Mena x Labrador 588)
 2008 FEI Eventing Young Horse World Championships - Ninth Place
 2011 European Championships - Team Fourth Place, Individual 12th Place
 2012 London Olympics - Team Fourth Place, Individual Silver Medal
 Reality 39 - 2004 Dark Bay Hanoverian Mare (Rabino x Prince Thatch XX)
 2013 European Championships - Team Silver Medal, Individual 14th Place
 2015 European Championships - Team Fifth Place, Individual 23rd Place
 2016 Rio Olympics - Team 11th Place, Individual 36th Place
 2017 European Championships - Team Silver Medal, Individual Ninth Place
 Coughar - 2010 Gray Swedish Warmblood Gelding (Camaro M x Cortez)
 2016 FEI Eventing Young Horse Championships - 19th Place

References

External links 
 Official Swedish homepage of Sara Algotsson Ostholt
 Official Swedish homepage of Algotsson Eventing
 Official German homepage of Team Ostholt Eventing

1974 births
Living people
Swedish female equestrians
Olympic equestrians of Sweden
Equestrians at the 2004 Summer Olympics
Equestrians at the 2012 Summer Olympics
Equestrians at the 2016 Summer Olympics
People from Kalmar Municipality
Olympic silver medalists for Sweden
Olympic medalists in equestrian
Medalists at the 2012 Summer Olympics
Equestrians at the 2020 Summer Olympics
Sportspeople from Kalmar County